Naryury Alexandra Pérez Reveron (born 29 September 1992) is a Venezuelan weightlifter who competes in the +75 kg division from Yaracuy. She won bronze medals at the 2013 and 2014 Pan American Championships and a silver medal at the 2015 Pan American Games. She failed all clean and jerk attempts at the 2016 Olympics and hence did not finish. In 2015, she was named Most Outstanding Athlete of the Year by the Institute of Sport Yaracuy and regional sports journalists.

Major results

References

External links 
 

1992 births
Living people
Olympic weightlifters of Venezuela
Weightlifters at the 2016 Summer Olympics
Venezuelan female weightlifters
Pan American Games medalists in weightlifting
Pan American Games silver medalists for Venezuela
Weightlifters at the 2015 Pan American Games
South American Games bronze medalists for Venezuela
South American Games medalists in weightlifting
Competitors at the 2018 South American Games
Weightlifters at the 2019 Pan American Games
Medalists at the 2015 Pan American Games
Pan American Weightlifting Championships medalists
Weightlifters at the 2020 Summer Olympics
21st-century Venezuelan women
People from San Felipe, Venezuela